The Senegalese Communist Party was a pro-China communist party in Senegal. It was formed by the then student leader Landing Savané in 1965. The party was short-lived, but Savané continued his political activity through other groups.

References 
 Zuccarelli, François. La vie politique sénégalaise (1940-1988). Paris: CHEAM, 1988.

Political parties established in 1965
Communist parties in Senegal
Defunct Maoist parties
Maoism in Africa